Ventspils Olimpiskais Stadions, more commonly called the Ventspils Stadions, is a multi-purpose stadium in Ventspils, Latvia. It is currently used mostly for football matches. Ventspils Stadions is the home stadium for FK Ventspils, and one of the most famous football stadia in the Latvia. The stadium holds 3,200 people.

See also
Ventspils Olympic Center Basketball Hall

Ventspils
Football venues in Latvia
Multi-purpose stadiums in Latvia